The 2012 United States House of Representatives elections in Rhode Island were held on Tuesday, November 6, 2012 to elect the two U.S. representatives from the state of Rhode Island, apportioned according to the 2010 United States Census. The elections coincided with the elections of other federal and state offices, including a quadrennial presidential election and an election to the U.S. Senate. Primary elections were held on September 11, 2012.

Overview

District 1

The redrawn 1st district represents Barrington, Bristol, Central Falls, Cumberland, East Providence, Jamestown, Lincoln, Little Compton, Middletown, Newport, North Providence, North Smithfield, Pawtucket, Portsmouth, Smithfield, Tiverton, Warren, Woonsocket, and parts of Providence.

Democrat David Cicilline, who has represented the 1st district since January 2011, ran for re-election.

Democratic primary

Candidates

Nominee
David Cicilline, incumbent U.S. Representative

Eliminated in primary
Anthony Gemma, businessman and candidate for this seat in 2010
Christopher Young, electrical engineer

Declined
David Segal, former state representative
Bill Lynch, former chair of the Rhode Island Democratic Committee
Patrick Lynch, former Attorney General of Rhode Island
Dan McKee, mayor of Cumberland
Merrill Sherman, president and chief executive officer of the Bank of Rhode Island

Polling

Primary results

Republican primary

Candidates

Nominee
Brendan Doherty, colonel and the retired  superintendent of the Rhode Island State Police

Declined
John Loughlin, former state representative and nominee for this seat in 2010

General election

Endorsements

Polling

Predictions

Results

District 2

The redrawn 2nd district will represent Burrillville, Charlestown, Coventry, Cranston, East Greenwich, Exeter, Foster, Glocester, Hopkinton, Johnston, Narragansett, New Shoreham, North Kingstown, Richmond, Scituate, South Kingstown, Warwick, West Greenwich, West Warwick, Westerly, and parts of Providence.

Democrat James Langevin, who has represented Rhode Island's 2nd congressional district since 2001, will run for re-election.

Abel Collins, an environmental activist, mounted an independent campaign in the general election.

Democratic primary

Candidates

Nominee
James Langevin, incumbent U.S. Representative

Eliminated in primary
John Matson, carpenter and perennial candidate

Primary results

Republican primary

Candidates

Nominee
Michael Riley, hedge fund manager,

Eliminated in primary
Michael Gardiner, attorney and candidate for this seat in 2010
Donald Rubbio
Kara Russo

Primary results

General election

Polling

Results

References

External links
Rhode Island Board of Elections
United States House of Representatives elections in Rhode Island, 2012 at Ballotpedia
Rhode Island U.S. House from OurCampaigns.com
Campaign contributions for Rhode Island congressional races from OpenSecrets
Outside spending at the Sunlight Foundation

2012
Rhode Island

2012 Rhode Island elections